RKSV Centro Dominguito is a football club based in Willemstad playing in the first division of Curaçao League.

Honours

Official trophies (recognized by CONCACAF and FIFA)

National
Sekshon Pagá (6):
1987, 2012, 2013, 2015, 2016, 2017

Sekshon Amatùr (3):
1979, 1981, 1983

Performance in CONCACAF competition
CONCACAF Champions' Cup: 1 appearance
CONCACAF Champions' Cup 1988 – First Round – (Caribbean Zone) – Lost to  La Gauloise de Basse-Terre 3–1 in the global result.

CFU Club Championship: 2 appearances
2014 CFU Club Championship – First Round group stage – (Caribbean Zone) – hosted by  Bayamón in Puerto Rico

2018 Caribbean Club Championship Tier 2 CONCACAF Caribbean Club Shield;– hosted by  Santiago in Dominican Republic

Current squad 2016-17

References

Cent
Cent
Association football clubs established in 1952
1952 establishments in Curaçao